The Imperial Telegraph Administration (ITA) or Imperial Chinese Telegraph Administration (ICTA) was a Qing-era government-controlled corporation (spec. guandu shangban) supervised by Sheng Xuanhuai.

The ITA was established in 1881, after which it swiftly gained a monopoly on Chinese telegraphy.

By 1900 the ITA administered 14,000 miles of telegraph wires and supervised another 20,000 miles under local control. The same year, it absorbed the infant Chinese telephone network started in Nanjing.

It was nationalized in 1902 to allow otherwise unprofitable usage rates and expansion of the network or to gain control of its profits. The ITA was then absorbed by the newly formed Ministry of Posts and Communications in 1906. Following nationalization, control alternated between Sheng and his political rival Tang Shaoyi.

See also
 Qing dynasty
 Self-Strengthening Movement
 Hundred Days' Reform
 Telecommunications in the People's Republic of China

References

Qing dynasty
Telegraph companies